George Henry Poyser (6 February 1910 – 30 January 1995) was an English football player and manager.

A defender, he enjoyed a lengthy playing career, the tail end of which was interrupted by World War II. He played for Wolverhampton Wanderers, Stourbridge, Mansfield Town, Port Vale, Brentford, and Plymouth Argyle. He helped Brentford to win the Second Division title in 1934–35.

He became a coach and manager after the war, taking charge of Dover, Notts County and Manchester City. He took County into the quarter-finals of the FA Cup, though he was better equipped as a scout than as a manager.

Playing career
Poyser played as a defender, and was a strong left-back. Playing for Teversal Colliery, he had an unsuccessful trial at Mansfield Town, before moving on to Stanton Hill Victoria. He enjoyed spells at Wolverhampton Wanderers and Stourbridge, before signing with Mansfield Town. He was part of the Mansfield team when they were elected to the Football League in 1931.

In May 1931, he joined Port Vale of the Second Division. His debut came on 2 January 1932, in a 2–0 win over Plymouth Argyle at The Old Recreation Ground. However, he totalled just six appearances for the "Valiants" in the 1931–32 campaign. He featured 28 times in the 1932–33 season, before establishing himself in the first team with 39 appearances in the 1933–34 campaign. He made 72 league appearances for Port Vale.

In June 1934 he transferred to Brentford for a fee of £1,550, a club record. In his first season at Brentford, the club won the Second Division championship. The "Bees" finished fifth in the First Division in 1935–36, sixth in 1936–37 and 1937–38, and then 18th in 1938–39. He remained at Griffin Park for a decade, making 157 appearances, though like many players of his era, the Second World War shortened his career, though he represented Brentford in the non-competitive wartime competitions.

The 36-year-old Poyser joined Plymouth Argyle for a £3,500 fee late in the 1945–46 season, making three Football League South appearances and a further three Second Division appearances. He left Home Park at the end of the 1946–47 season.

Management career
Poyser first turned to management with Dover. He then returned to his old professional clubs in a coaching capacity, becoming the assistant trainer at Brentford and a coach at Wolverhampton Wanderers.

His management career gained more recognition at Notts County, whom he managed between October 1953 and January 1957, reaching the FA Cup quarter-finals in 1955. Former Notts County winger Gordon Wills regards Poyser as the best manager he played for. The "Magpies" struggled in the lower half of the Second Division during his four seasons at Meadow Lane, though they did reach seventh in the 1954–55 season.

In January 1957 Poyser joined Manchester City as assistant to Les McDowall, with a reputation for being a talented scout. Manchester City were relegated to the Second Division in 1963, and McDowall left the club. On 12 July 1963, Poyser was appointed as his replacement. He made three key signings in Derek Kevan, Jimmy Murray, and Johnny Crossan, whilst promoting home-grown talent in Alan Oakes and Glyn Pardoe – both of whom went on to build long careers at the club. In his first season, the club reached the League Cup semi-finals, but were well short of promotion in the league, finishing sixth. His second season proved disappointing, and in January 1965 the club reached a low point with their lowest ever league attendance of 8,015 against Swindon Town. Poyser himself was not at the stadium, as he had elected to perform a scouting mission instead. At Easter Poyser was sacked, and the club finished the season in their then lowest ever position of 11th in the Second Division. His replacement, Joe Mercer, went on to great success at Maine Road.

Career statistics

Playing statistics

Managerial statistics

Honours
Brentford
Football League Second Division: 1934–35
London War Cup: 1941–42

Individual

Brentford Hall of Fame

References

1910 births
1995 deaths
People from Stanton Hill
Footballers from Nottinghamshire
English footballers
Association football defenders
Wolverhampton Wanderers F.C. players
Stourbridge F.C. players
Mansfield Town F.C. players
Port Vale F.C. players
Brentford F.C. players
Plymouth Argyle F.C. players
Dover F.C. players
English Football League players
English football managers
Dover F.C. managers
Notts County F.C. managers
Manchester City F.C. managers
English Football League managers
Association football coaches
Association football scouts